The International Sanamahism Students' Association (ISSA), also called the International Sanamahism Students' Association, Kangleipak, is an international non-governmental organization of students of Sanamahism (traditional Meitei religion).
It gives its services to the conservation and the upraising of the practices of Sanamahism in the society. It also draws the attention to the government of Manipur state to take up essential steps to protect Sanamahism from getting extinct.

Foundation day celebrations 
The International Sanamahism Students' Association celebrate its annual foundation day events on:
 14th October 2015 - as the 1st foundation day at Manipur Press Club
 21st September 2017 - as the 4th foundation day at Lamyanba Shanglen, Palace Compound, Imphal
 29th September 2019 - as the 6th foundation day at Lamyanba Sanglen, Konung Lampak, Imphal
 7th Oct 2021 - as the 8th foundation day at the Manipur Press Club in Imphal

Felicitation of the King 
In response to their encouragement and recognition of his deeds, Sanajaoba said that the efforts to officially recognize Meitei language as an Indian classical language was "in the process of materialisation".

Training camp 
From 24th April 2019 to 28th April 2019, the International Sanamahism Students' Association organised a 5-day students' leadership training camp at the District Institute of Education and Training (DIET) in Keikol, with the aim "to cultivate the youths with the sense of belongingness and spirit of nationalism."

Quiz competition 
On 22nd September 2019, the International Sanamahism Students' Association organized a quiz competition titled "Know Your Kangleipak (Manipur)" at GP Women's College, Imphal.

Actions against "vulgar portrayal" 
In October 2017, the International Sanamahism Students' Association demanded clarification from the author ("Omor Singh Wangkhem") and the printer ("Kangla Printers") of the book "The Writers Mahabharatta & Rammayana as the Real Religious Scientists", while the "Manipuri Students' Federation" (MSF) had banned the book from being sold and bought. The 13th and the 27th pages of the book compare Meitei goddesses as "prostitutes", using distasteful language and nothing other than disregarding the sacred Meitei cosmology.

Later on, through the Meitei language newspaper daily "HUEIYEN LANPAO", the writer of the book apologized to the angered associations for his misdeeds as follows:

Tree plantation programs 
On 14th July 2019, the International Sanamahism Students' Association, along with the "Kangla Enat Yokhat Lup", "Salai Taret Punshi Luptil", "Kangleipak Chaokhatna Lup", organised a tree plantation program at Langol Punsilok, Imphal, to achieve a greener Manipur.
They selectively planted the indigenous trees in the event to save indigenous plant species.
During the event, the organization also reminded the participants about the ancient Meitei ways to preserved forests, in which the Umang Lai shrines used to preserve forested areas and atleast one pond was essentially kept near each site.

Resolving conflicts 
In February 2021, the International Sanamahism Students' Association, serving as a conflict resolver, appealed to the two opposing student groups of the Manipur University of Culture (MUC) to agree the orders of the vice chancellor of the institution, regarding the admission to Master's degree.

See also 
 Lainingthou Sanamahi Temple Board (LSTB) 
 Lainingthou Sanamahi Sana Pung (LSSP) 
 Lainingthou Sanamahi Kiyong
 University of Sanamahi Culture

Notes

References

External links 
 International Sanamahism Students' Association at 

Cultural organizations
International nongovernmental organizations
International organizations
Meitei culture
Non-governmental organizations
Organisations based in Imphal
Religious organizations
Sanamahism